07 zgłoś się (07 come in) is a Polish criminal television series broadcast on TVP from 25 November 1976 to 25 May 1989. The series consists of 21 episodes, divided into five seasons, filmed in 1976, 1978, 1981, 1984, and 1987, respectively. It combines elements of action and police procedural genres.

Background
Directed by Krzysztof Szmagier and scored by Wlodzimierz Korcz, the series centers on the investigations of Police Lieutenant Sławomir Borewicz (played by Bronisław Cieślak), who solves a different case in each episode. The show was loosely based on the novel series  (Ewa calls 07). The title of both the novels and the TV series refers to "zero-seven", a police radio call-sign used by Borewicz. The show shared a number of similarities, and one complete storyline, with the comic book series Kapitan Żbik.

Despite being widely considered a work of propaganda aimed at warming the image of the "Citizen's Militia", the series proved highly popular in Poland and even gained a cult following. Critics called it "one of the biggest achievements of Polish crime drama", a "raw and realistic response to James Bond", and "the most popular Polish police series ever".

References

External links
 

Polish drama television series
Television shows set in Warsaw
1976 Polish television series debuts
1987 Polish television series endings
Polish crime television series
1970s Polish television series
1980s Polish television series
Telewizja Polska original programming